A software language is an artificial language used in the development of software systems. The term is more general than programming language and also includes modelling languages, query languages, transformation languages, software interfaces, database schemata, domain-specific languages, markup languages, etc.

Further reading
 Anneke Kleppe, Software Language Engineering: Creating Domain-Specific Languages using Metamodels, Addison-Wesley, 2008, .
 Ralf Lämmel, Software Languages: Syntax, Semantics, and Metaprogramming, Springer .

External links
 Software Language Engineering Conference Series (yearly since 2008)
 Software Language Engineering course at Koblenz University, Germany.
 Software Language Engineering course at University of Bergen, Norway.
 Software Language (Engineering) Body of Knowledge

Notation